General Pearson may refer to:

Alfred Astley Pearson (1850–1937), British Indian Army general
Alfred L. Pearson (1838–1903), Union Army brevet major general
Charles Pearson (British Army officer) (1834–1909), British Army lieutenant general
Peter Pearson (British Army officer) (born 1954), British Army lieutenant general
Sandy Pearson (1918–2012), Australian Army major general
Thomas Pearson (British Army officer, born 1782) (1782–1847), British Army lieutenant general
Thomas Pearson (British Army officer, born 1914) (1914–2019), British Army general
Thomas Hooke Pearson (1806–1892), British Army general
Willard Pearson (1915–1996), U.S. Army lieutenant general